Bidenichthys okamotoi, is a fish of the family Bythitidae, and is found at the Koko Seamount in the Central North Pacific.

Etymology
The species is named after the collector of the two type specimens, Dr. Makoto Okamoto, of the Seikai National Fisheries Research Institute, in honor of his numerous contributions to Pacific ichthyology.

References

Bythitidae
Taxa named by Peter R. Møller
Taxa named by Werner W. Schwarzhans
Taxa named by Henrik Lauridsen
Taxa named by Jørgen G. Nielsen
Fish described in 2021